Păstorel Teodoreanu, or just Păstorel (born Alexandru Osvald (Al. O.) Teodoreanu; July 30, 1894 – March 17, 1964), was a Romanian humorist, poet and gastronome, the brother of novelist Ionel Teodoreanu and brother in law of writer Ștefana Velisar Teodoreanu. He worked in many genres, but is best remembered for his parody texts and his epigrams, and less so for his Symbolist verse. His roots planted in the regional culture of Western Moldavia, which became his main source of literary inspiration, Păstorel was at once an opinionated columnist, famous wine-drinking bohemian, and decorated war hero. He worked with the influential literary magazines of the 1920s, moving between Gândirea and Viața Românească, and cultivated complex relationships with literary opinion-makers such as George Călinescu.

After an unsuccessful but scandalous debut in drama, Teodoreanu perfected his work as a satirist, producing material which targeted the historian-politician Nicolae Iorga and the literary scholar Giorge Pascu, as well as food criticism which veered into fantasy literature. As an affiliate of Țara Noastră, he favored a brand of Romanian nationalism which ran against Iorga's own. Corrosive or contemplative, Păstorel's various sketches dealt with social and political issues of the interwar, continuing in some ways the work of Ion Luca Caragiale. In the 1930s, inspired by his readings from Anatole France and François Rabelais, he also published his celebrated "Jester Harrow" stories, mocking the conventions of historical novels and Renaissance literature. His career peaked in 1937, when he received one of Romania's most prestigious awards, the National Prize.

Teodoreanu was employed as a propagandist during World War II, supporting Romania's participation on the Eastern Front. From 1947, Păstorel was marginalized and closely supervised by the communist regime, making efforts to adapt his style and politics, then being driven into an ambiguous relationship with the Securitate secret police. Beyond this facade conformity, he contributed to the emergence of an underground, largely oral, anti-communist literature. In 1959, Teodoreanu was apprehended by the communist authorities, and prosecuted in a larger show trial of Romanian intellectual resistants. He spent some two years in prison, and reemerged as a conventional writer. He died shortly after, without having been fully rehabilitated. His work was largely inaccessible to readers until the 1989 Revolution.

Biography

Early life
The Teodoreanu brothers were born to Sofia Muzicescu, wife of the lawyer Osvald Al. Teodoreanu. The latter's family, originally named Turcu, hailed from Comănești; Osvald's grandfather had been a Romanian Orthodox priest. Sofia was the daughter of Gavril Muzicescu, a famous composer from Western Moldavia. When Păstorel was born, on July 30, 1894, she and her husband were living at Dorohoi. Ionel (Ioan-Hipolit Teodoreanu) and Puiuțu (Laurențiu Teodoreanu) were his younger siblings, born after the family had moved to Iași, the Moldavian capital city. Osvald's father, Alexandru T. Teodoreanu, had previously served as City Mayor, while an engineer uncle, also named Laurențiu, was the first manager of the original Iași Power Plant. The Teodoreanus lived in a townhouse just outside Zlataust Church. They were neighbors of poet Otilia Cazimir and relatives of novelist Mărgărita Miller Verghy.

From 1906, Alexandru Osvald attended the National High School Iași, in the same class as the film critic and economist D. I. Suchianu. Young Păstorel had a vivid interest in literary activities and, critics note, acquired a solid classical culture. The final two years of his schooling were spent at Costache Negruzzi National College, where he eventually graduated. He became friends with a future literary colleague, Demostene Botez, with whom he shared lodging at the boarding school. Years later, in one of his reviews for Botez's books, Teodoreanu confessed that he once used to steal wine from Botez's own carboy.

In 1914, just as World War I broke out elsewhere in Europe, he was undergoing military training at a Moldavian cadet school, leading him to graduate from the Artillery School of Bucharest in 1916. Over the following months, Osvald Teodoreanu became known for his support of prolonged neutrality, which set the stage for a minor political scandal. When, in 1916, Romania joined the Entente Powers, Alexandru was mobilized, a Sub-lieutenant in the 24th artillery regiment, Romanian Land Forces. He had just published his first poem, a sonnet of unrequited love, uncharacteristic for his signature writing. As he recalled, his emotional father accompanied him as far west as the army would allow. The future writer saw action in the Battle of Transylvania, then withdrew with the defeated armies into besieged Moldavia. His fighting earned him the Star of Romania and the rank of Captain.

Meanwhile, Puiuțu Teodoreanu volunteered for the French Air Force and died in April 1918. During the same interval, Ionel, still in Iași, fell in love with Ștefana "Lily" Lupașcu, who became his wife. She was half French, and, through her, the Teodoreanus became cousins in law of Cella and Henrieta Delavrancea (orphaned daughters of writer Barbu Ștefănescu Delavrancea); and of Stéphane Lupasco, the French philosopher.

In 1919, upon demobilization, Alexandru returned to Iași. Like Ionel, he became a contributor to the magazines Însemnări Literare and Crinul, and also proofread for the former. He took a law degree from Iași University, and, in 1920, moved to the opposite corner of Romania, employed by the Turnu Severin Courthouse. He only spent a few months there. Before the end of the year, he relocated to Cluj, where Cezar Petrescu employed him as a staff writer for his literary magazine, Gândirea. The group's activity was centered on Cluj's New York Coffeehouse. Together with another Gândirea author, Adrian Maniu, Teodoreanu wrote the fantasy play Rodia de aur ("Golden Pomegranate"). It was published by the Moldavian cultural tribune, Viața Românească, and staged by the National Theater Iași in late 1920. Some months later, Teodoreanu was co-opted by theatrologist Ion Marin Sadoveanu into the Poesis literary salon, whose members militated for modernism.

In short while, Al. O. Teodoreanu became a popular presence in literary circles, and a famous bon viveur.  The moniker Păstorel, candidly accepted by Teodoreanu, was a reference to these drinking habits: he was said to have "tended" (păstorit) the rare wines, bringing them to the attention of other culinary experts. His first contribution to food criticism was published by Flacăra on December 31, 1921, with the title Din carnetul unui gastronom ("From a Gastronomer's Notebook"). Teodoreanu integrated with the bohemian society in several cities, leaving written records of his drunken dialogues with linguist Alexandru Al. Philippide. At Iași, the Teodoreanus, including Ștefana, tightened their links with Viața Românească, and with novelist Mihail Sadoveanu; Păstorel greatly admired the group's doyen, critic Garabet Ibrăileanu. A visitor, modernist poet-critic Felix Aderca, reported seeing Păstorel at Viața Românească, "plotting" against the National Theater Bucharest, because, unlike the nationalist theatrical companies of Iași, it only rarely staged Romanian plays. Aderca's antagonistic remarks, published in Sburătorul, reflected growing tensions between the modernist circles in Bucharest and the cultural conservatives in Iași.

Țara Noastră period

Teodoreanu's only solo work as a playwright was the one-act comedy V-a venit numirea ("Your Appointment Has Been Received"), written in 1922. In 1923, he published his "Inscriptions on a Coffeehouse Table" in the satirical magazine Hiena, which was edited by Gândireas Pamfil Șeicaru. While receiving his first accolades as a writer, Păstorel was becoming a sought-after public speaker. Together with Gândireas other celebrities, he toured the country and gave public readings from his works (1923). He also made an impact with his welcome speech for Crown Princess Ileana and her "Blue Triangle" Association of Christian Women. The address culminated in a polite pun: "I finally understood that the Blue Triangle is not a circle, but a sum of concentric circles, whose center is Mistress Ileana, and whose radius reaches into our hearts."

Teodoreanu was also involved in the cultural and political quarrels of postwar Greater Romania, taking the side of newcomers from Transylvania, who criticized the country's antiquated social system; they proposed an "integral" version of Romanian nationalism. In January 1925, Păstorel began writing for the Transylvanian review Țara Noastră and became, together with Octavian Goga and Alexandru "Ion Gorun" Hodoș, its staff polemicist. In the mid-1920s, Păstorel's satire had found its main victim: Nicolae Iorga, the influential historian, poet and political agitator. According to Goga and Hodoș, Iorga's older brand of nationalism was unduly self-serving, irresponsible, and confusing.

Teodoreanu followed up with satirical pieces, comparing the omnipresence of Iorga "the demigod" with the universal spread of novelty Pink Pills. He also ridiculed Iorga's ambitions in poetry, drama, and literary theory: "Mr. Iorga doesn't get how things work, but he is able to persuade many others: he is dangerous." Teodoreanu was courted by the modernist left-wing circles, which were hostile to Iorga's traditionalism, and was a guest writer for a (formerly radical) art magazine, Contimporanul. Păstorel's editorial debut came only later. In 1928, Cartea Românească publishers issued his parody historical novel, titled Hronicul Măscăriciului Vălătuc ("The Chronicle of Jester Harrow"). His Trei fabule ("Three Fables") were taken up by Bilete de Papagal, an experimental literary newspaper managed by poet Tudor Arghezi. While Teodoreanu expected Hronicul to be an inside joke for him and his friends, it was a national best-seller. It also earned him a literary award sponsored by the Romanian Academy.

Teodoreanu made frequent appearances in Bucharest, for instance participating at the Romanian Writers' Society functions—in November 1926, he attended the banquet honoring Rabindranath Tagore, who as visiting Romania. In 1929 the National Theater, chaired by Liviu Rebreanu, staged a new version of Rodia de aur. The event brought Păstorel into collision with the modernists: at Cuvântul, theatrical reviewer Ion Călugăru ridiculed Rodia de aur as a backward, "childish", play. The verdict infuriated Teodoreanu, who, according to press reports, visited Călugăru at his office, and pummeled him in full view. According to Curentul daily, he threatened onlookers not to intervene, brandishing a revolver. At Casa Capșa, where he was residing ca. 1929, Păstorel was involved in another publicized squabble, throwing cakes at a table where Rebreanu sat together with the modernists Camil Baltazar, Ion Theodorescu-Sion and Ilarie Voronca. At the time, the Ilfov County tribunal received a legal complaint from Călugăru, who accused Teodoreanu of assault and repeated death threats. History does not record whether Teodoreanu was ever brought to court. Contimporanul also took its distance from Teodoreanu, who received negative reviews in its pages.

Păstorel returned to food criticism, with chronicles published in Lumea, a magazine directed by literary historian George Călinescu, in Bilete de Papagal, and in the left-wing review Facla. He was involved in the dispute opposing Ibrăileanu to philologist Giorge Pascu, and, in December 1930, published in Lumea two scathing articles against the latter. Pascu sued him for damages. Also in 1930, he joined the National Theater Iași directorial staff, where he supported the production of plays by Ion Luca Caragiale; his colleagues there were Moldavian intellectuals from the Viața Românească group: Sadoveanu, Demostene Botez, Mihail Codreanu, Iorgu Iordan. Like Sadoveanu and Codreanu, he was inducted into the Romanian Freemasonry's Cantemir Lodge. The formal initiation had an embarrassing twist: Teodoreanu turned up inebriated, and, during the qualifying questionnaire, stated that he was "damned well pleased" to become a Mason.

Gastronomice years

The volume Strofe cu pelin de mai pentru/contra Iorga Neculai ("Stanzas in May Wormwood for/against Iorga Neculai") was published in 1931, reportedly at the expense of Păstorel's friends and allies, since it had been refused "by all of the nation's publishing houses". However, bibliographies list it as put out by a Viața Românească imprint. The book came out just after Iorga had been appointed Prime Minister. According to one anecdote, the person most embarrassed by the Strofe was Osvald Teodoreanu, who had been trying to relaunch his public career. Osvald is said to have toured the Iași bookstores on the day Strofe came out, purchasing all copies because they could reach the voters.<ref name="btconflict"> Bianca Tănase, [https://web.archive.org/web/20220704071159/https://historia.ro/sectiune/portret/pastorel-teodoreanu-de-la-umor-la-conflict-571316.html"Păstorel Teodoreanu, de la umor la conflict"], in Historia (online edition)</ref> Iorga sued Păstorel for defamation, but gave up on his claim for compensation.

More officially, Teodoreanu published two sketch story volumes: in 1931, Mici satisfacții ("Small Satisfactions") with Cartea Românească; in 1933, with Editura Națională Ciornei—Rosidor, Un porc de câine ("A Swine of a Dog"). Eventually, Teodoreanu left Moldavia behind, and moved to Bucharest, where he rented a Grivița house. With help from the cultural policy-maker, General Nicolae M. Condiescu, he was employed as a book reviewer for The Royal Foundations Publishing House, under manager Alexandru Rosetti.

He also became a professional food critic for the literary newspaper Adevărul Literar și Artistic, with a column he named Gastronomice ("Gastronomics"), mixing real and imaginary recipes. It was in Bucharest that he met and befriended Maria Tănase, Romania's leading female vocalist. Still indulging in his pleasures, Teodoreanu was living beyond his means, pestering Călinescu and Cezar Petrescu with requests for loans, and collecting from all his own debtors. Ibrăileanu, who still enjoyed Teodoreanu's capers and appreciated his talent, sent him for review his novel, Adela. Păstorel lost and barely recovered the manuscript, then, in his drunken escapades, forgot to review it, delaying its publication.

A collection of Al. O. Teodoreanu's lampoons and essays, of which some were specifically directed against Iorga, saw print in two volumes (1934 and 1935). Published with Editura Națională Ciornei, it carries the title Tămâie și otravă ("Frankincense and Poison"), and notably includes Teodoreanu's thoughts on social and cultural policies. The two books were followed in 1935 by another sketch story volume, eponymously titled Bercu Leibovici. In its preface, Teodoreanu announced that he refused to even classify this work, leaving classification to "morons and rubberneckers". The following year, the prose collection Vin și apă ("Wine and Water") was issued by Editura Cultura Națională. Also in 1936, Teodoreanu contributed the preface to Romania's standard cookbook, assembled by Sanda Marin.

Osvald Teodoreanu and his two living sons participated in the grand reopening of Hanul Ancuței, a roadside tavern in Tupilați, relocated to Bucharest. The other members and guests were literary, artistic and musical celebrities: Arghezi, D. Botez, Cezar Petrescu, Sadoveanu, Cella Delavrancea, George Enescu, Panait Istrati, Milița Petrașcu, Ion Pillat and Nicolae Tonitza. Păstorel tried to reform the establishment into a distinguished wine cellar, and wrote a code of conduct for the visitors. The pub also tried to engender a literary society, dedicated primarily to the reformation of Romanian literature, and, with its profits, financed young talents. The Hanul Ancuței episode ended when Teodoreanu was diagnosed with liver failure. Sponsored by the Writers' Society, he treated his condition at Karlovy Vary, in Czechoslovakia. The experience, which meant cultural isolation and a teetotal's diet, led Teodoreanu to declare himself an enemy of all things Czechoslovak. During his stays in Karlovy Vary, he corresponded with his employer, Rosetti, keeping with the events in Romania, but wondering if Romanians still remembered him.

Păstorel was a recipient of the 1937 National Prize for Prose. The jury comprised other major writers of the day: Rebreanu, Sadoveanu, Cezar Petrescu, Victor Eftimiu. Teodoreanu was especially proud about this achievement: in his own definition, the National Prize was an endorsement "worth its weight in gold". He impressed the other literati at the celebratory dinner, where he was "dressed to the nines" and drank with moderation. After the event, Teodoreanu turned his attention to his poetry writing: in 1938, he published the booklet Caiet ("Notebook"). The same year, Ionel joined his older brother in Bucharest.

World War II and communist takeover
The Teodoreanu brothers were public supporters of the authoritarian regime instituted, in 1938, by King Carol II, contributing to the government propaganda. The king returned the favor and, also in 1938, Păstorel was made a Knight of Meritul Cultural Order, 2nd Class. From autumn 1939, when the start of World War II left Romania exposed to foreign invasions, Teodoreanu was again called under arms. Stationed with his 24th artillery regiment in the garrison of Roman, he put on hold his regular food chronicles. However, his military duties quickly dissolved into wine-drinking meals. This was attested by Corporal Gheorghe Jurgea-Negrilești, an aristocrat and memoirist, who served under Teodoreanu and remained his friend in civilian life. In 1940, Teodoreanu worked with Ion Valentin Anestin, writing the editorial "Foreword" to Anestin's satirical review, Gluma, and published a series of aphorisms in Revista Fundațiilor Regale. Returning to Bucharest, he stayed at Carlton Tower, until the building was destroyed in the November 10 earthquake; for a while, Teodoreanu himself was presumed dead.

By then, Romania, under Conducător Ion Antonescu, became an ally of Nazi Germany. In summer 1941, the country joined in the German attack on the Soviet Union (Operation Barbarossa). Teodoreanu took employment as an Antonescu regime propagandist, publishing, in the newspaper Universul, a panegyric dedicated to pilot Horia Agarici. Țara newspaper of Sibiu hosted his scathing anti-communist poem, Scrisoare lui Stalin ("A Letter to Stalin"). His brother and sister in law followed the same line, the former with novels which had anti-Soviet content.

A second edition of Bercu Leibovici came out in 1942, followed in 1934 by a reprint of Caiet. Still living in Bucharest, Teodoreanu kept company with Jurgea-Negrilești. According to the latter, Păstorel had friendly contacts with novelist Paul Morand, who was the diplomatic representative of Vichy France in Bucharest. The story shows a high-strung Teodoreanu, who defied wartime restriction to obtain a bowler hat and gloves, and dressed up for one of Morand's house-parties. In mid-1944, at the peak of Allied bombing raids, Teodoreanu had taken refuge in Budești, a rural commune south of the capital. He was joined there by Maria Tănase and her husband of the time.

After the King Michael's Coup broke apart Romania's alliance with the Axis Powers, Teodoreanu returned to regular journalism. His food criticism was again taken up by Lumea, and then by the general-interest Magazin. Lacking a stable home, he was hosted at The Royal Foundations Publishing House, and could be seen walking about its library in a red housecoat. Teodoreanu's contribution to wartime propaganda made him a target for retribution in the Romanian Communist Party press. Already in October 1944, România Liberă and Scînteia demanded for him to be excluded from the Writers' Society, noting that he had "written in support of the anti-Soviet war". Ionel and his wife also faced persecution for sheltering wanted anti-communists Mihail Fărcășanu and Pia Pillat-Fărcășanu.

Păstorel's career was damaged by the full imposition, in 1947, of a Romanian communist regime. In May 1940, Teodoreanu had defined humor as "the coded language that smart people use to understand each other under the fools' noses". Resuming his food writing after 1944, he began inserting subtle jokes about the new living conditions, even noting that the widespread practice of rationing made his texts seem "absurd". Traditionally, his cooking recommendations had been excessive, and recognized as such by his peers. He firmly believed that cozonac cake required 50 eggs for each kilogram of flour (that is, some 21 per pound).

The communists were perplexed by the Păstorel case, undecided about whether to punish him as a dissident or enlist him as a fellow traveler. Păstorel was experiencing financial ruin, living on commissions, handouts and borrowings. He tried to talk Maria Tănase into using his poems as song lyrics, and stopped seeing her altogether when her husband refused to lend him money. In 1953, aged 58 or 59, he married Marta Poenaru, daughter of the renowned surgeon Constantin Poenaru Căplescu and more distantly descended from architect Pierre Charles L'Enfant. Păstorel's brother Ionel died suddenly in February 1954, leaving Păstorel devastated. He compensated for the loss by keeping company with other intellectuals of the anti-communist persuasion. His literary circle, hosted by the surviving Bucharest locales, included, among others, Jurgea-Negrilești, Șerban Cioculescu, Vladimir Streinu, Aurelian Bentoiu, and Alexandru Paleologu.

Censorship and show trial
By 1954, Teodoreanu was being called in for questioning by agents of the Securitate, the communist secret police. Pressure was put on him to divulge his friends' true feelings about the political regime. He avoided a direct answer, but eventually informed Securitate about Maria Tănase's apparent disloyalty. While harassed in this manner, Teodoreanu was already earning a leading place in underground counterculture, where he began circulating his new anti-communist compositions. According to literary critic Ion Simuț, the clandestine poetry of Păstorel, Vasile Voiculescu and Radu Gyr is the only explicit negation of communism to have emerged from 1950s Romania. As other Securitate records show, the public was aware of Teodoreanu's visits to the Securitate, but distinguished between him, who was "called over" to confess, and those who made voluntary denunciations.

In trying to salvage his career, Teodoreanu was forced to diversify his literary work. In 1956, his literary advice for debuting authors was hosted by the gazette Tînărul Scriitor, an imprint of the Communist Party School of Literature. He also completed and published translations from Jaroslav Hašek (Soldier Švejk) and Nikolai Gogol (Taras Bulba). In 1957, he prefaced the collected sonnets of Mihail Codreanu, and issued, with Editura Tineretului, a selection of his own prose, Berzele din Boureni ("The Storks of Boureni"). Samples of his communist-era works were read out at the Bucharest Literary Week in December of that year. With Călinescu, Teodoreanu worked on La Roumanie Nouvelle, the French-language communist paper, where he had the column Goutons voir si le vin est bon ("Let's Taste the Wine and See if It's Good").

From 1957 to 1959, Teodoreanu resumed his food chronicles in Magazin, while also contributing culinary reviews in Glasul Patriei and other such communist propaganda newspapers. According to researcher Florina Pîrjol: "the scion of bourgeois intellectuals, with his liberal values and his aristocratic spirit, unsuitable for political "taming", Al. O. Teodoreanu had a rude awakening into a world where, perceived as a hostile element, he was unable to exercise his profession". According to literary reviewer G. Pienescu, who worked with Teodoreanu in the 1960s, the Glasul Patriei collaboration was supposed to grant Păstorel a "certificate of good citizenship".

Under pressure from communist censorship, Teodoreanu was reconfiguring his literary profile. Dropping all references to Western cuisine, his food criticism became vague, reusing agitprop slogans about "goodwill among men", before adopting in full the communists' wooden tongue. Although the country was still undernourished, Păstorel celebrated the public self-service chain, Alimentara, as a "structural transformation" of the Romanian psyche. Meanwhile, some anti-communist texts, circulated by Teodoreanu among the underground dissidents, were intercepted by the authorities. Those who have documented Teodoreanu's role in the development of underground humor note that he paid a dear price for his contributions. "Gheorghe Grigurcu în dialog cu Șerban Foarță", in România Literară, Issues 51–52/2007 On October 30, 1959, he was arrested, amidst a search for incriminating evidence. The Securitate relied on reports from its other informers, one of whom was Constantin I. Botez, the psychologist and academic. His manuscripts, including draft translations from William Shakespeare and a novel, were confiscated.

The writer became one of 23 intellectuals implicated in a show trial, whose main victims were writer Dinu Pillat and the philosopher Constantin Noica. Although grouped together, these men and women were accused of a variety of seditious deeds, from engaging in "hostile conversations" to keeping company with Western visitors. One thing they had in common was their relationship with Noica: they had all attended meetings in Noica's home, listening to his readings from the letters of a banished philosopher, Emil Cioran. In Teodoreanu's specific case, the authorities also recovered a fable of his from the 1930s, where he was ridiculing communism as the rally-call of rebellious donkeys. His newer poems were also recovered through the testimonies of some who had heard them. The presiding judge, Adrian Dumitriu, asked Teodoreanu why he ever felt the need to contribute such works. Păstorel noted that it was impossible for him to stop: "chickens lay eggs, and I compose epigrams"; he also added: "if there's nothing else we can do [for our country], let's at least suffer for her sake."

Prison term, illness, and death
Teodoreanu received a sentence of six years in "correctional prison", with three years of loss of rights, and permanent confiscation of his assets.Tudoraș, p. 175 Communist censors took over his manuscripts, some of which were unceremoniously burned. These circumstances forced Marta Teodoreanu to work nights as a street sweeper. Held in confinement at Aiud prison, Păstorel reportedly complained of having been brutalized by one of the guards. While in Gherla prison, Teodoreanu filed an appeal: he admitted to having ridiculed communism, and to having distanced himself from Socialist Realism, but asked to be allowed a second chance, stating his usefulness in writing "propaganda". Reportedly, the Writers' Union, whose President was Demostene Botez, made repeated efforts to obtain his liberation. Teodoreanu was not informed of this, and was shocked to encounter Botez, come to plead in his favor, in the prison warden's office. He was ultimately granted a reprieve on April 30, 1962, together with many other political prisoners, and allowed to return to Bucharest. Later that year, he paid his friends in Iași what would be his final visit, the memory of which would trouble him to his death.

Teodoreanu returned to public life, but was left without the right of signature, and was unable to support himself and Marta. In this context, he sent a letter to the communist propaganda chief, Leonte Răutu, indicating that he had "redeemed his past", and asking to be allowed back into the literary business. Păstorel made his comeback with the occasional column, in which he continued to depict Romania as a land of plenty. Written for Romanian diaspora readers, just shortly after the peak of food restrictions, these claimed that luxury items (Emmental, liverwurst, Nescafé, Sibiu sausages) had been made available in every neighborhood shop. His hangout was the  Hotel, where he befriended an eccentric communist, poet Nicolae Labiș. Helped by Pienescu, he was preparing a collected works edition, Scrieri ("Writings"). The communist censors were adverse to its publishing, but, after Tudor Arghezi spoke in Teodoreanu's favor, the book was included in the "fit for publishing" list of 1964.

Păstorel was entering the terminal stages of lung cancer, receiving palliative care at his house on Vasile Lascăr Street, in Bucharest's Armenian Quarter. Teodoreanu's friend and biographer, Alexandru Paleologu, calls his "an exemplary death". According to Paleologu, Teodoreanu had taken special care to render his suffering bearable for those around him, being "lucid and courteous". Jurgea-Negrilești was present at one of the group's last meetings, recalling: "At the very last drop [of wine], he got up on his feet... there was gravitas about him, a greatness that I find hard to explain. In a voice that his pain had made hoarse, he asked that we leave him alone". Teodoreanu died at home, on March 17, 1964, just a day after Pienescu brought him news that censorship had been bypassed; in some sources, the date of death is given as March 15. He was buried, alongside Ionel Teodoreanu, in the Delavrancea crypt at Bellu cemetery.Gheorghe G. Bezviconi, Necropola Capitalei, p. 269. Bucharest: Nicolae Iorga Institute of History, 1972 Six hundred people were in attendance, but, owing to Securitate surveillance, the funeral remained a quiet affair. The Writers' Union was only represented by two former Gândirea contributors, Maniu and Nichifor Crainic. They were not mandated to speak about the deceased, and kept silent, as did the Orthodox priest who was supposed to deliver the service.

The writer had left two translations (Anatole France's Chronicle of Our Own Times; Prosper Mérimée's Nouvelles), first published in 1957. As Pienescu notes, he had never managed to sign the contract for Scrieri. Without children of his own, he was survived by his sister in law Ștefana and her twin sons, and by cousin Alexandru Teodoreanu, himself a former, pardoned, detainee.Ostap (2012), pp. 53–54 Ștefana lived to age 97, and continued to publish as a novelist and memoirist, although from ca. 1982 she withdrew into near-complete isolation at Văratec Monastery. The last-surviving of her sons died without heirs in 2006.

Work

Jester Harrow

Common themes
Culturally, Teodoreanu belonged to the schools of interwar nationalism, be they conservative (Gândirea, Țara Noastră) or progressive (Viața Românească). Some exegetes have decoded proof of patriotic attachment in the writer's defense of Romanian cuisine, and especially his ideas about Romanian wine. Șerban Cioculescu once described his friend as a "wine nationalist" and George Călinescu suggested that Păstorel was entirely out of his element when discussing French wine. On one hand, Păstorel supported illusory claims of Romanian precedence (including a story that caviar was discovered in Romania); on the other, he issued loving, if condescending, remarks about Romanians being a people of "grill cooks and mămăligă eaters". However, Teodoreanu was irritated by the contemplative traditionalism of Moldavian writers, and, as Cioculescu writes, his vitality clashed with the older schools of nationalism: Nicolae Iorga's Sămănătorul circle and "its Moldavian pair", Poporanism. Philosophically, he remained indebted to Oscar Wilde and the aestheticists.

The frame story Hronicul Măscăriciului Vălătuc is, to at least some degree, an echo of "national specificity" guidelines, as set by Viața Românească. It is however also remembered as a most atypical contribution to Romanian literature, and, critics argue, "one of his most valuable books", a "masterpiece". Nevertheless, the only commentator to have been impressed by the totality of Hronicul, and to have rated Păstorel as one of Romania's greatest humorists, is the aestheticist Paul Zarifopol. His assessment was challenged, even ridiculed, by the academic community. The consensus is nuanced by critic Bogdan Crețu, who writes: "Păstorel may well be, as far as some care to imagine, peripheral in literature, but [...] he is not at all a minor writer."

According to Călinescu, Hronicul Măscăriciului Vălătuc parallels Balzac's Contes drôlatiques. Like the Contes, Jester Harrow's tale reuses, and downgrades, the conventions of medieval historiography—in Păstorel's text, the material for parody is Ion Neculce's Letopisețul țărâi Moldovei. As both the writer and his reviewers have noted, Teodoreanu mixed the subversive "counterfeiting" of Neculce's history into his own loving homage to the Moldavian dialects and their verbal clichés. Archaic Moldavian, he explained in a 1929 interview, was highly distinct from officialese; he related to it as "the language I used to speak, but forgot", the voicing of one's "deep melancholy". He specified his models: the Moldavian chroniclers, Neculce and Miron Costin; the modern pastiches, Balzac's Contes and Anatole France's Merrie Tales of Jaques Tournebroche. In addition, literary historian Eugen Lovinescu believes, Teodoreanu was naturally linked to the common source of all modern parodies, namely the fantasy stories of François Rabelais. Păstorel's "so very Rabelaisian" writing has a "thick, big, succulent note, that will saturate and overfill the reader".

In several editions, they are bound together with various other works, covering several literary genres. According to biographer Gheorghe Hrimiuc, the latter category is less accomplished than the "chronicle". It notably includes various of Teodoreanu's attacks on Iorga.

Particular episodes

Although the presence of anachronisms makes it hard to even locate the stories' time-frame, they seem to be generally referencing the 18th- and 19th-century Phanariote era, during which Romanians adopted a decadent, essentially anti-heroic, lifestyle. A recurrent theme is that of the colossal banquet, in most cases prompted by nothing other than the joy of company or a carpe diem mentality, but so excessive that they drive the organizers into moral and material bankruptcy. In all five episodes, Păstorel disguises himself as various unreliable narrators. He is, for instance, a decrepit General Coban (Pursângele căpitanului) and a retired courtesan (Inelul Marghioliței). In Neobositulŭ Kostakelŭ, a "found manuscript", he has three narrative voices: that of the writer, Pantele; that of the skeptic reviewer, Balaban; and that of the concerned "philologist", with his absurd critical apparatus (a parody of scientific conventions). The alter ego, "Harrow", is only present (and mentioned by name) in the rhyming Predoslovie ("Foreword"), but is implicit in all the stories.

Also in Neobositulŭ Kostakelŭ, Teodoreanu's love for role-playing becomes a study in intertextuality and candid stupidity. Pantele is a reader of Miron Costin, but seemingly incapable of understanding his literary devices. He reifies metaphoric accounts about a Moldavian Princedom "flowing with milk and honey": "Had this been in any way true, people would be glued to fences, like flies". Even the protagonist, Kostakel, is a writer, humorist and parodist, who has produced his own chronicle of "obscenities" with the stated purpose of irritating Ion Neculce (who thus makes a brief appearance within Harrow's "chronicle"). The deadpan critical apparatus accompanying such intertextual dialogues is there to divert attention from Teodoreanu's narrative tricks and anachronisms. Hrimiuc suggests that, by pretending to read his own "chronicle" as a valid historical record, Păstorel was sending in "negative messages about how not to decode the work".Neobositulŭ Kostakelŭ and Pursângele căpitanului comprise some of Păstorel's ideas about the Moldavian ethos. The locals have developed a strange mystical tradition, worshiping Cotnari wine, and regarding those who abstain from it as "enemies of the church". The author also highlights the Moldavian boyars' loose sexual mores: weak husbands are resigned cuckolds, Romani slaves are used for staging sexual farces; however, as Zarifopol argues, this type of prose does not seek to be "aphrodisiac". The scenes of merrymaking are played out for a melancholy effect. In Neobositulŭ Kostakelŭ, the antagonist is Panagake, an outsider (Graeco-Romanian) and usurper of tradition. Although he suffers defeat and ridicule, he is there to announce that the era of joy is coming to a conclusion. As critic Doris Mironescu notes, characters experience an "entry into time", except "theirs is not Great history, but a minor one, that of intimate disasters, of homemaking tragedies and the domestic hell."
 Hronicul satirizes the conventions of Romanian neoromanticism and of the commercial adventure novel, or penny dreadful, particularly so in Cumplitul Trașcă Drăculescul. The eponymous hero is a colossal and unpredictable hajduk, born with the necessary tragic flaw. He lives in continuous erotic frenzy, pushing himself on all available women, "without regard as to whether they were virgins or ripe women, not even if they had happened to be his cousins or his aunts". Still, he is consumed by his passion for the nubile Sanda, but she dies, of "chest trouble", on the very night of their wedding. The broken Trașcă commits suicide on the spot. These events are narrated with the crescendo of romantic novels, leading to the unceremonious punch line: "And it so happened that this Trașcă of the Draculas was ninety years of age."

Caragialesque prose
Teodoreanu's Mici satisfacții and Un porc de câine echo the classical sketch stories of Ion Luca Caragiale, a standard in Romanian humor. Like him, Păstorel looks into the puny lives and "small satisfactions" of Romania's petite bourgeoisie, but does not display either Caragiale's malice or his political agenda.Hrimiuc, pp. 296–301; Teodoreanu & Ruja, pp. 10–11 His own specialty is the open-ended, unreliably-narrated, depiction of mundane events: the apparent suicide of a lapdog, or (in Berzele din Boureni) an "abstruse" dispute about the flight patterns of storks.Un porc de câine pushed the jokes a little further, risking to be branded an obscene work. According to critic Perpessicius, "a witty writer can never be an obscene writer", and Păstorel had enough talent to stay out of the pornographic range. Similarly, Cioculescu describes his friend as an artisan of "libertine humor", adverse to didactic art, and interested only in "pure comedy". In his narrator's voice, Păstorel mockingly complains that the banal was being replaced by the outstanding, making it hard for humorists to find subject matters. Such doubts are dispelled by the intrusion of a blunt, but inspirational, topic: "Can it be true that mayweed is an aphrodisiac?" In fact, Un porc de câine expands Teodoreanu's range beyond the everyday, namely by showing the calamitous, entirely unforeseeable, effects of an erotic farce. The volume also includes a faux obituary, honoring the memory of one Nae Vasilescu. This stuttering tragedian, whose unredeemed ambition was to play Shylock, took his revenge on the acting profession by becoming a real-life usurer—an efficient if dishonorable way to earning the actors' fear and respect.

Critics have rated Teodoreanu as a Caragialesque writer, or a "Moldavian", "thicker", more archaic Caragiale.Călinescu, pp. 776–777; Teodoreanu & Ruja, p. 13 Hrimiuc suggests that Caragiale has become an "obligatory" benchmark for Teodoreanu's prose, with enough differences to prevent Păstorel from seeming an "epigone". Hrimiuc then notes that Teodoreanu is entirely himself in the sketch S-au supărat profesorii ("The Professors Are Upset"), fictionalizing the birth of the National Liberal Party-Brătianu with "mock dramaticism", and in fact poking fun at the vague political ambitions of Moldavian academics. As a Caragiale follower, Teodoreanu remained firmly within established genre. Doris Mironescu describes his enrollment as a flaw, placing him in the vicinity of "minor" Moldavian writers (I. I. Mironescu, Dimitrie D. Pătrășcanu), and noting that his "obvious model" was the memoirist Radu Rosetti. The other main influence, as pinpointed by literary critics, remains Teodoreanu's personal hero, Anatole France. In Tămâie și otravă, Teodoreanu is, like France, a moralist. However, Călinescu notes, he remains a "jovial" and "tolerable" one.

Symbolist poetry
Păstorel had very specific tastes in poetry, and was an avid reader of the first-generation Symbolists. Of all Symbolist poets, his favorite was Paul Verlaine, whose poems he had memorized to perfection, Al. Săndulescu, "Mâncătorul de cărți", in România Literară, Issue 11/2008 but he also imitated Henri de Régnier, Albert Samain and Jean Richepin. Like Verlaine, Teodoreanu had mastered classical prosody, so much so that he believed it was easier, and more vulgar, for one to write in verse—overall, he preferred prose. He was entirely adverse to Romania's modernist poetry, most notably so when he ridiculed the work of Camil Baltazar; even in his lyrical work of the 1930s, Teodoreanu recovered older, consecrated Symbolist synaesthesia and lyrical tropes, such as the arrival of autumn and the departure of loved ones.

In Caiet, he is also a poet of the macabre, honoring the ghoulish genre invented by his Romanian Symbolist predecessors. According to critics such as Călinescu and Alexandru Paleologu, his main reference is Alexandru Macedonski, the Romanian Symbolist master. Paleologu notes that Păstorel is the more "lucid" answer to Macedonski's unlimited "Quixotism". Together with the carpe diem invitation in Hronicul, Caiet is an implicit celebration of life:

Teodoreanu's contribution to Romanian poetry centers on an original series, Cântecèle de ospiciu ("Tiny Songs from a Hospice"), written from the perspective of the dangerously insane. As Călinescu notes, they require "subtle humor" from the reader. For instance, some veer into delirious monologues:

Scattered texts and apocrypha
As a poet of the mundane, Teodoreanu shared glory with the other Viața Românească humorist, George Topîrceanu. If their jokes had the same brevity, their humor was essentially different, in that Topîrceanu preserved an innocent worldview. In this class of poetry, Teodoreanu had a noted preference for orality, and, according to interwar essayist Petru Comarnescu, was one of Romania's "semi-failed intellectuals", loquacious and improvident. As an impish journalist, he always favored the ephemeral. Păstorel's work therefore includes many scattered texts, some of which were never collected for print. Gheorghe Hrimiuc assessed that his aphorisms, "inscriptions" and self-titled "banal paradoxes" must number in the dozens, while his epigram production was "enormous".

In his attacks on Nicolae Iorga, the epigrammatist Păstorel took the voice of Dante Aligheri, about whom Iorga had written a play. Teodoreanu's Dante addressed his Romanian reviver, and kindly asked to be left alone. Anti-Iorga epigrams abound in Țara Noastră pages. Attributable to Teodoreanu, they are signed with various irreverent pen names, all of them referencing Iorga's various activities and opinions: Iorgu Arghiropol-Buzatu, Hidalgo Bărbulescu, Mița Cursista, Nicu Modestie, Mic dela Pirandola. On the friendly side, the fashion of exchanging epigrams was also employed by Teodoreanu and his acquaintances. In one such jousting, with philosopher Constantin Noica, Teodoreanu was ridiculed for overusing the apostrophe (and abbreviation) to regulate his prosody; Teodoreanu conceded that he could learn "writing from Noica".

Other short poems merely address the facts of life in Iași or Bucharest. His first ever quatrain, published in Crinul, poked fun at the Imperial Russian Army, whose soldiers were still stationed in Moldavia. A later epigram locates the hotspot of prostitution in Bucharest: the "maidens" of Popa Nan Street, he writes, "are beautiful, but they're no maidens". In 1926, Contimporanul published his French-language calligram and "sonnet", which recorded in writing a couple's disjointed replies during the sexual act. Teodoreanu's artistic flair was poured into his regular letters, which fictionalize, rhyme and dramatize everyday occurrences. These texts "push into the borders of literature" (Hrimiuc), and are worthy of a "list of great epistolaries" (Crețu). Călinescu believes that such works should be dismissed, being "without spirit", "written in a state of excessive joy, that confuses the writer about the actual suggestive power of his words".

Urban folklore and communist prosecutors recorded a wide array of anti-communist epigrams, attributed (in some cases, dubiously) to Al. O. Teodoreanu. In early 1947, the outlawed National Peasants' Party (PNȚ) was putting out leaflets featuring political satires of the new regime; PNȚ man Liviu Tudoraș argues that two such works were by Teodoreanu. Păstorel the purported author of licentious comments about communist writer Veronica Porumbacu and her vagina, and about the "arselicking" communist associate, Petru Groza.Pîrjol, p. 25 The latter is also ridiculed in one piece which is more generically about government policies after the Soviet occupation of Romania:

Other epigrams ridiculed the intellectual abilities of Groza's cabinet members, and especially the Minister of Agriculture, :

Elsewhere, Păstorel asks listeners to answer him a riddle: who has failing grades for conduct in school "but holds sway over the country"? The prize for respondents is "20 years behind bars." One other piece, written after the Tito–Stalin split of 1949, alleges that Georgi Dimitrov had been murdered by the Soviets. Tradition also credits him with the corrosive joke about the Statue of the Soviet Liberator, a monument which towered over Bucharest from 1946: 

Elsewhere, Teodoreanu derided the communists' practice of enrolling former members of the fascist Iron Guard, nominal enemies, into their own Workers' Party. His unflattering verdict on this unexpected fusion of the political extremes was mirrored by co-defendant Dinu Pillat, in the novel Waiting for the Last Hour. Teodoreanu's famous stanza is implicitly addressed to "Captain" Corneliu Zelea Codreanu, the Guard's founder and patron saint:

The political epigrams also record Teodoreanu's reception of the "Secret Speech", which marked the onset of De-Stalinization:

In cultural memory
With his constant networking, Păstorel Teodoreanu made a notable impact in the careers of other writers, and, indirectly, on visual arts. Some of his works came with original drawings: illustrations by Ion Sava (for Strofe cu pelin de mai); a portrait of the writer, by Ștefan Dimitrescu (Mici satisfacții); and graphics by Ion Valentin Anestin (Vin și apă). One of the first to borrow from Hronicul was George Lesnea, the author of humorous poems about Moldavia's distant past, and a recipient of the Hanul Ancuței literary prize. A young author of the 1940s, Ștefan Baciu, drew inspiration from both Gastronomice and Caiet in his own humorous verse.

In the late 1960s, when liberalization touched Romanian communism, most restrictions on Teodoreanu's work were lifted. In July 1969, the Prosecutor General filed appeals for both Teodoreanu and Vladimir Streinu, effectively ensuring their rehabilitation; during this procedure, the authorities claimed that Teodoreanu's epigrams had been burned in 1960, and, as such, that any definitive evidence of wrongdoing had been lost before the author's prosecution. Editura Tineretului had by then published a volume called Hronicul Măscăriciului Vălătuc, which in fact sampled much of his lifetime work, while leaving out most of the mock-historical texts. Scholar Marcel Duță gave a poor review to this "minuscule anthology", noting that it had failed to underscore Păstorel's cultural relevance.

1972 was a breakthrough year in Teodoreanu's recovery, with a selection of his poems and a new edition of Hronicul; the latter was to become "the most readily reedited" Teodoreanu work, down to 1989. Prefacing the former, D. I. Suchianu noted with pessimism that "those who understood [Teodoreanu] are all pretty much dead"; at the time, Păstorel's political works were still not publishable, and a full corpus of writings was therefore impossible. Later communism only brought a bibliophile edition of his Gastronomice, with drawings by Done Stan, and a selection of food criticism, De re culinaria ("On Food"). In 1988, at Editura Sport-Turism, critic Mircea Handoca published a travel account and literary monograph: Pe urmele lui Al. O. Teodoreanu-Păstorel ("On the Trail of Al. O. Teodoreanu-Păstorel").Ciobanu, p. 245; Ostap (2012), p. 54; Teodoreanu & Ruja, pp. 8, 16 Since 1975, Iași has hosted an epigrammatists' circle honoring Teodoreanu's memory. Known as "Păstorel's Free Academy", it originally functioned in connection with Flacăra Iașului newspaper, and was therefore controlled by the communist authorities.

After the Romanian Revolution of 1989 lifted communist restrictions, it became possible for exegetes to investigate the totality of Teodoreanu's contributions. From 1994, he was periodically honored in his native city by the Vasile Pogor literary society. His anti-communist apocrypha have been featured in a topical volume, edited by Gheorghe Zarafu and Victor Frunză in 1996, but remain excluded from the standard Teodoreanu collections (including one published by Rodica Pandele at Humanitas). Also, under the new regime, food writing was again a profession, and Păstorel became a direct inspiration for gastronomes such as Radu Anton Roman or Bogdan Ulmu, who wrote "à la Păstorel". As such, Doris Mironescu suggests, Teodoreanu made it into "a sui-generis national pantheon" of epigrammatists, with Lesnea, Cincinat Pavelescu, and Mircea Ionescu-Quintus. Formal public recognition came in 1997, when the Museum of Romanian Literature honored the Teodoreanu brothers' memory with a plaque, unveiled at their childhood home in Iași. A street in the industrial part of the city was also named after him. However, the Zlataust building was partly demolished by its new owners in 2010, a matter which fueled political controversies.

Notes

References
Lucian Boia, Capcanele istoriei. Elita intelectuală românească între 1930 și 1950. Bucharest: Humanitas, 2012.  
George Călinescu, Istoria literaturii române de la origini pînă în prezent. Bucharest: Editura Minerva, 1986.
Paul Cernat, Avangarda românească și complexul periferiei: primul val. Bucharest: Cartea Românească, 2007.  
Claudia Ciobanu, "Contextualizări cromatice în lirica lui Al. O. Teodoreanu", in Asachiana. Revistă de Biblioteconomie și de Cercetări Interdisciplinare, Vol. 2–3, 2014–2015, pp. 243–252.
Claudia Costin, "Alexandru O. Teodoreanu, Hronicul Măscăriciului Vălătuc – între 'specificul național' și modernism", in Asachiana. Revistă de Biblioteconomie și de Cercetări Interdisciplinare, Vols. 2–3, 2014–2015, pp. 253–267.
Ileana Ghemeș, "Drumul revistei Țara Noastră în 1925", in the December 1 University of Alba Iulia Philologica Yearbook, 2002, pp. 66–75.
Gheorghe Hrimiuc, postface and notes to Al. O. Teodoreanu, Hronicul Măscăriciului Vălătuc, pp. 292–334. Iași: Editura Junimea, 1989.  
Eugen Lovinescu, Istoria literaturii române contemporane. Bucharest: Editura Minerva, 1989.  
Doris Mironescu, "Craii lui Păstorel. De la savoir vivre la savoir mourir", in Timpul, Issue 9/2008, pp. 16–17.
Constantin Ostap, "Cu gândul la "Teodoreni"...", in Dacia Literară, Issues 3–4/2012, pp. 53–57.
Florina Pîrjol, "Destinul unui formator de gusturi. De la savoarea "pastilei" gastronomice la gustul fad al compromisului", in Transilvania, Issue 12/2011, pp. 16–26.
Alexandru Piru, Viața lui G. Ibrăileanu. Bucharest: Fundația Regală pentru Literatură și Artă, 1946.
 Mircea Popa, "Ștefan Baciu - colaborări și versuri uitate", in Steaua, Issues 10–11, October–November 2011, pp. 90–93.
Păstorel Teodoreanu, Alexandru Ruja, Tămâie și otravă. Timișoara: Editura de Vest, 1994.  
Liviu Tudoraș, "Umor din spațiul concentraționar comunist românesc. Păstorel Teodoreanu și Petre Țuțea", in Memoria. Revista Gândirii Arestate'', Issues 45–46, 2003, pp. 175–186.

1894 births
1964 deaths
20th-century Romanian poets
Romanian male poets
Sonneteers
Romanian epigrammatists
Romanian fabulists
Symbolist poets
20th-century Romanian novelists
Romanian historical novelists
Romanian male novelists
20th-century short story writers
Romanian male short story writers
Romanian short story writers
Aphorists
Romanian propagandists
20th-century Romanian dramatists and playwrights
Male dramatists and playwrights
Romanian fantasy writers
Romanian humorists
Romanian food writers
Restaurant critics
Oenologists
Romanian erotica writers
20th-century essayists
Male essayists
Romanian essayists
Romanian columnists
20th-century translators
Romanian translators
English–Romanian translators
French–Romanian translators
Translators from Czech
Translators from Russian
Translators of William Shakespeare
Romanian writers in French
Adevărul writers
Contimporanul writers
Gândirea
People from Dorohoi
Members of the Romanian Orthodox Church
Romanian Freemasons
Costache Negruzzi National College alumni
Alexandru Ioan Cuza University alumni
20th-century Romanian lawyers
Romanian Land Forces officers
Recipients of the Order of the Star of Romania
Romanian military personnel of World War I
Romanian military personnel of World War II
Romanian dissidents
Romanian anti-communists
Romanian nationalists
Securitate informants
People detained by the Securitate
Inmates of Aiud prison
Inmates of Gherla prison
Gastronomes
Censorship in Romania
Deaths from cancer in Romania
Deaths from lung cancer
Burials at Bellu Cemetery
Socialist Republic of Romania rehabilitations